Attorney General Webster may refer to:

Richard Webster, 1st Viscount Alverstone (1842–1915), Attorney General for England and Wales
William L. Webster (born 1953), Attorney General of Missouri

See also
General Webster (disambiguation)